Han Na-Kyeong (also Han Na-Gyeong, ; born June 23, 1993 in Seoul) is a South Korean swimmer, who specialized in long-distance freestyle events. Han is a member of the swimming team at Sehyeon High School in Seoul.

Han qualified for the women's 800 m freestyle at the 2012 Summer Olympics in London, by eclipsing a FINA B-standard entry time of 8:50.16 from the Dong-A Swimming Championships in Ulsan. She challenged seven other swimmers on the second heat, including two-time Olympians Lynette Lim of Singapore, Khoo Cai Lin of Malaysia, and Nina Dittrich of Austria. She rounded out the field to last place by five seconds behind Lim in 8:57.26. Han failed to qualify for the final, as she placed thirty-second overall in the preliminary heats.

References

External links
NBC Olympics Profile

1993 births
Living people
Olympic swimmers of South Korea
Swimmers at the 2012 Summer Olympics
South Korean female freestyle swimmers
Swimmers from Seoul
21st-century South Korean women